İlayda Alişan (born 26 February 1996) is a Turkish actress.

Life and career
Alişan was born on 26 February 1996 in Istanbul. She is a graduate of Behçet Kemal Çağlar High School. 

Her interest in acting began at a young age and she made her television debut in 2011 with a role in the Bir Çocuk Sevdim TV series. She continued her career with recurring roles in series such as Rüya, Bana Sevmeyi Anlat, Gönül Hırsızı, Benim Adım Gültepe and Serçe Sarayı. In 2017, Alişan was cast in the TV series Çukur, starring alongside Aras Bulut İynemli and Dilan Çiçek Deniz. In 2019, she joined the cast of Şampiyon.

Between 2019 and 2020, she had a recurring role in the Netflix original series Hakan: Muhafız. She then appeared in the Gain original series Terapist in 2021. In 2021, Alişan starred in the series Masumiyet and depicted the character of Ela, the show starred Hülya Avşar, Mehmet Aslantuğ and Deniz Çakır as leading characters. She also appeared as a guest on Kırmızı Oda with Erdem Şanlı.

In 2022, she played in the romantic comedy series Seversin opposite Burak Yörük. In 2023, she starred in İyi Adamın 10 Günü, a Netflix adaptation of a novel with the same title. In the same year, she began starring in the TV series Ateş Kuşları with Burak Tozkoparan, Erdem Şanlı.

Filmography

Awards and nominations

References

External links 
 

1996 births
Living people
Turkish television actresses
Golden Butterfly Award winners
Actresses from Istanbul
21st-century Turkish actresses
Istanbul Bilgi University alumni